Rachel Marie Oberlin (born October 7, 1986), known professionally as Bree Olson, is an American actress, model, and former pornographic actress. She performed in over 600 pornographic films from 2006 to 2011. Since leaving the adult film industry, she has become critical of the industry and the stigma attached to being a former porn actress.

Early life
Olson was born in Houston, Texas. Olson's mother and stepfather moved with her to Fort Wayne, Indiana when she was two years old.

Career

Adult films
Olson entered the pornographic film industry in November 2006, and initially worked for a variety of companies such as Digital Playground, Elegant Angel, and Red Light District Video. 
She was a contract performer with Adam & Eve from 2007 to 2010.

Olson was named Penthouse Pet of the Month for March 2008. In 2010, she was named by Maxim as one of the 12 top female stars in porn. She appeared on the cover of the May 2011 issue of Penthouse, on the cover of the August 2011 issue of Playboy magazine, and on the cover of the July 2013 issue of Hustler magazine. She retired from shooting pornography in 2011 at the age of 25.

Mainstream TV and cinema
Olson has appeared on the E! Network reality show Keeping Up with the Kardashians.
She appeared in the independent comedy film Purgatory Comics (2009),
co-starred in the horror film The Human Centipede 3 (Final Sequence) (2015) and appeared in Penn Jillette and Adam Rifkin's Director's Cut (2016). In 2015, she played Divatox in the short, web film Power/Rangers.
She has also done a series of videos for Will Ferrell and Adam McKay's website Funny or Die.

Personal life

In February 2011, Olson moved in with actor Charlie Sheen as one of the girlfriends whom he nicknamed his "goddesses". Her relationship with Sheen ended in April 2011.

In 2016, she related her post-porn social life in The Daily Dot, stating, "porn didn't hurt me. The way society treats me for having done it does". This article was later followed by her March 25 appearance in the YouTube documentary series "Real Women, Real Stories", in which she repeated these statements, adding that she believes society in general perceives ex-porn stars in a highly negative manner, specifically as morally akin to pedophiles. She is also critical of the pornography industry, noting "We are the only entertainment industry that doesn't offer talent royalties after they are gone," but not of the profession itself.

Legal issues

On February 3, 2011, Olson was arrested and charged with driving under the influence in her home town of Fort Wayne, Indiana. She pleaded guilty to the DUI charge and received a year of probation and requirement to perform community service.

Awards

 2007 NightMoves Award – Best New Starlet (Editor's Choice)
 2008 AVN Award – Best New Starlet
 2008 AVN Award – Best Anal Sex Scene (Video) – Big Wet Asses 10 
 2008 XRCO Award – New Starlet
 2008 XRCO Award – Cream Dream
 2008 F.A.M.E. Award – Favorite Female Rookie
 2008 XBIZ Award – New Starlet of the Year
 2008 NightMoves Award – Best Female Performer (Fan's Choice)
 2008 Adam Film World Guide Award – Starlet of the Year
 2009 AVN Award – Best New Web Starlet – BreeOlson.com
 2009 NightMoves Award – Best Female Performer (Fan's Choice)
 2010 AVN Award – Best All-Girl Three-Way Sex Scene – The 8th Day 
 2011 NightMoves Award – Best Social Media Star (Editor's Choice)
 2012 XRCO Award – Mainstream Adult Media Favorite

References

External links

 
 
 
 

21st-century American actresses
Actresses from Houston
American female adult models
American pornographic film actresses
Indiana University – Purdue University Fort Wayne alumni
Penthouse Pets
Pornographic film actors from Indiana
Pornographic film actors from Texas
Year of birth missing (living people)
Living people